Jennifer Tracy Almeda-Singian (born October 6, 1979) is a former professional tennis player from the United States.

Biography
Almeda-Singian was born in New York City and is of Filipino descent. At the age of four she moved to New Jersey where she first started to play tennis. Later training in Orlando, she made her WTA Tour debut in the main doubles draw of Indian Wells in 1996, partnering Alexandra Stevenson.

She competed in the qualifying draw of all four grand slam tournaments during her career, once successfully, at the 1999 US Open. Her only other grand slam main draw appearance came as a wildcard at the 2000 US Open and she was beaten in the first round by sixth seed Monica Seles.

On the WTA Tour her best performances were in 2000, when she made the second round of tournaments in Amelia Island and Antwerp.

She now works as a marketing manager for Red Bull.

ITF finals

Singles (1–2)

Doubles (0–3)

References

External links
 
 

1979 births
Living people
American female tennis players
Tennis people from New York (state)
Sportspeople from New York City
American sportspeople of Filipino descent
21st-century American women